Lyudmyla Balushka (born July 27, 1985 in Lviv) is a female wrestler from Ukraine.

She was educated at the Lviv State University of International Affairs, and the Lviv State School of Physical Culture.

External links
 bio on fila-wrestling.com

Living people
1985 births
Ukrainian female sport wrestlers
Sportspeople from Lviv
World Wrestling Championships medalists
European Wrestling Championships medalists
20th-century Ukrainian women
21st-century Ukrainian women